Duncan of Jordanstone College of Art & Design (DJCAD) is part of the University of Dundee in Dundee, Scotland. It is ranked as one of the top schools of art and design in the United Kingdom.

History
Attempts were made to establish an art school in Dundee in the 1850s, and evening classes in art were taught at the High School and the YMCA with great success. A full-time art school only became a possibility following the creation of the Dundee Technical Institute in 1888. The institute was based in Small's Wynd, now part of the University of Dundee's main campus, and shared facilities with what was then University College, Dundee.

From the start, art classes were taught at the Institute in the evenings by George Malcolm, but in 1892 Thomas Delgaty Dunn was appointed as the first full-time art master, and the college later came to regard this as the date of its foundation.

The Technical Institute's main building, designed by J Murray Robertson, soon became inadequate, particularly when the High School and YMCA art classes were amalgamated with those of the institute. A fund-raising campaign was launched in 1907, and in 1911 the Institute moved to new and much grander premises on Bell Street, designed by Robert Gibson and James Langlands, where it re-opened as Dundee Technical College & School of Art. A further incentive to the development of the school came in 1909 with the bequest of £60,000 by James Duncan of Jordanstone  to establish an independent art school in the city. A lengthy legal battle ensued as to whether the existing college could spend the money, and it was not until the 1930s that an agreement was reached whereby the college was reorganised as Dundee Institute of Art & Technology, the College of Art to be autonomously run on a separate site away from the Technical College. A site was chosen and plans drawn up by architect James Wallace in 1937, but due to delays largely caused by the war, construction did not begin until 1953. Classes began in what is now called the Crawford Building in 1955, though it would not be completed until 1964.

The college was renamed Duncan of Jordonstone College of Art in 1961 but did not become entirely independent of the Institute of Technology (now the University of Abertay) until 1975. By that time it has expanded into a new building next door (now called the Matthew Building, designed by Baxter Clark & Paul). The college remained independent until 1994 when it became part of the University of Dundee. Over time Duncan of Jordanstone has built up strong academic links with other disciplines in the university, manifested in joint programmes such as Medical Art, Forensic Art and Art & Humanities.

Structure
DJCAD is a school within the University of Dundee and is led by current Dean, Professor Anita Taylor. DJCAD is structured around Undergraduate, Postgraduate and Research portfolios rather than the more traditional disciplinary departmental approach. The school is located within the Crawford and Matthew buildings, with part of the Matthew building shared with the separate Architecture department.

Notable alumni

 Johanna Basford
 Roger Ball
 Clio Barnard
 Gary Clark
 Calum Colvin OBE
 Katy Dove
 Malcolm Duncan
 Luke Fowler
 Jackie Hatfield
 Euan Heng
 Patrick Hennessy (painter)
 Geoff Holder
 Marine Joatton
 Anna King
 David Mach
 Lucy McKenzie
 James McIntosh (Food Writer)
 Farshid Moussavi (Architect)
 Russ Nicholson
 Christopher Orr
 Deborah Phillips
 Susan Philipsz
 Derek Robertson
 Tom Simpson
 Sneha Solanki
 Tony Stallard
 Voytek
 Albert Watson
 David Mackenzie (film director)

Notable Staff 

 Edward Baird
 Calum Colvin
 Hugh Adam Crawford
 Dalziel + Scullion
 Ronald Forbes
 David McClure
 Alison McKenzie
 Joseph McKenzie
 Will Maclean
 Alberto Morrocco
 Stephen Partridge
 James McIntosh Patrick
 Elaine Shemilt
 Scott Sutherland
 Dudley D Watkins

Research 
The college research was rated highly in the last UK Higher Education research assessment of 2014 (The REF2014). The Times rated DJCAD as first in Scotland for art and design, and equal 3rd in the UK by Grade Point Average (Intensity) with 58% of its outputs at 3 or 4-star. The Impact element of DJCAD Research was graded 60% at 4-star and 40% at 3-star. The REF judged DJCAD's research environment, including underlying support and infrastructure, external income, and PhD performance, 100% at either 3 or 4-star levels. The college was commended for its established research culture and interdisciplinary and collaborative research, with a PhD community which in 2014  numbers around 45 with 25 Post Doctoral Research Assistants. Research projects and students are either clustered around the facilities within the college buildings including the campus based Research Studio.

Exhibitions: sites and galleries
Temporary exhibitions are held in various galleries within the college. Since January 2008, 72 exhibitions, 68 events, 11 performances, 27 talks, 11 seminars/workshops and 3 symposia have been staged. There are four galleries: Cooper Gallery (215 sq. metres); Cooper Gallery Project Space (100 sq. metres); Bradshaw Art Space (90 sq. metres); Matthew Gallery (300 sq. metres). As well as the galleries in the college, work from the college's collections and exhibitions by notable alumni are shown in the Lamb Gallery, the Tower Foyer Gallery and other venues around the university.

Collections 
The college also maintains an art collection of work by its students, usually acquired from the annual Degree Shows. The collection is now managed as a public museum collection by the University of Dundee Museum Services. There are also important holdings of furniture design, textile design from the Needlework Development Scheme, video art and a large archive and collection from performance artist Alastair MacLennan. Work by College staff is regularly exhibited in sites owned by the City of Dundee, the university generally or the DCA as well as in events throughout the world.

abcD | artists’ books collection Dundee

The DJCAD Library houses a large collection of Artists' books (artists’ books collection Dundee -abcD)- originally established in 1999 as the Centre for Artists Books by Alec Finlay, now with 1,450 books, multiples and ephemera from 600 artists represented in the collection. (Notable names include Andy Warhol, Marcel Duchamp, Carl Andre, John Cage, Valie Export, Bruce Nauman, Dieter Roth, Carolee Schneemann, Jake & Dinos Chapman, Susan Hiller, Yoko Ono, Helen Douglas, Tacita Dean, Bruce Maclean, David Shrigley, Julian Opie, John Latham, Simon Starling, Ian Hamilton Finlay, David Bellingham and Toby Paterson).

Dundee Degree Show and Dundee Masters Show
The Dundee Degree Show is organised annually in May to showcase the work of final year undergraduate students. It usually runs for around a week.

Awards:
2013 - UK Event Awards - Educational Event of the Year 
2014 - New Designers -  Best Stand Award

Gallery

References

External links
 DJCAD website
 University of Dundee website
 The Duncan's of Jordanstone & Drumfork Biography
 Cooper Gallery website

1888 establishments in Scotland
Art schools in Scotland
University of Dundee
Education in Dundee